The perrhenate ion is the anion with the formula , or a compound containing this ion. The perrhenate anion is tetrahedral, being similar in size and shape to perchlorate and the valence isoelectronic permanganate.  The perrhenate anion is stable over a broad pH range and can be precipitated from solutions with the use of organic cations.  At normal pH, perrhenate exists as metaperrhenate, but at high pH mesoperrhenate forms.  Perrhenate, like its conjugate acid perrhenic acid, features rhenium in the oxidation state of +7  with a d0 configuration. Solid perrhenate salts takes on the color of the cation.

Preparation
Typical perrhenate salts are the alkali metal derivatives and ammonium perrhenate.  These salts are prepared by oxidation of rhenium compounds with nitric acid followed by neutralization of the resulting perrhenic acid. Addition of tetrabutylammonium chloride to aqueous solutions of sodium perrhenate gives tetrabutylammonium perrhenate, which is soluble in organic solvents.

Reactions of perrhenates

Basicity
Silver perrhenate reacts with trimethylsilyl chloride to give the silyl "ester" (CH3)3SiOReO3.

Reaction with sulfide
With sulfide sources such as hydrogen sulfide,  converts to tetrathioperrhenate anion .   An intermediate is [ReO3S]−.

Dehydration
Heating ammonium perrhenate gives Re2O7.

Redox
Unlike the related permanganate, perrhenate is nonoxidising. Replacement of some oxo ligands induces redox however.  Thus the perrhenate ion reacts with the cyanide to give trans-[ReO2(CN)4]3−. Treatment of tetrabutylammonium perrhenate with trimethylsilyl chloride produces the oxychloride of Re(V):
Bu4N[ReO4]  +  6 Me3SiCl → Bu4N[ReOCl4]  +  3 (Me3Si)2O  +  Cl2

Complement to pertechnetate
The chemistry of the perrhenate ion is similar to that of the pertechnetate ion .  For this reason, perrhenate is sometimes used as a carrier for trace levels of pertechnetate, for instance in nuclear medicine scanning procedures. Perrhenate is also used as a safer alternative to pertechnetate for nuclear waste vitrification studies, such as volatility or encapsulation in solids.

References

See also
 Permanganate
 Pertechnetate

 
Transition metal oxyanions